The Miles M.20 was a Second World War British fighter developed by Miles Aircraft in 1940. It was designed as a simple and quick-to-build "emergency fighter" alternative to the Royal Air Force's Spitfires and Hurricanes should their production become disrupted by bombing expected in the anticipated German invasion of the United Kingdom. Due to the subsequent shifting of the German  bombing effort after the Battle of Britain towards British cities in  what became known as The Blitz, together with the dispersal of British fighter manufacturing, the Luftwaffe's bombing of the original Spitfire and Hurricane factories did not seriously affect production, and so the M.20 proved unnecessary and the design was not pursued.

Design and development
At the outbreak of the Second World War in September 1939, Miles Aircraft began work on a single-engined fighter to supplement the RAF's Spitfires and Hurricanes. A wooden mock-up of the design, the M20/1, was inspected by Sir Kingsley Wood, the Secretary of State for Air, but no orders followed. Following the outbreak of the Battle of Britain in July 1940, the Royal Air Force was faced with a potential shortage of fighters. To meet the Luftwaffe threat, the Air Ministry commissioned Miles to design a simple easy-to-build fighter to specification F.19/40. This became the Miles M.20/2. Nine weeks and two days later the first prototype flew.

To reduce production time the M.20 employed all-wood construction and used many parts from the earlier Miles Master trainer, lacked hydraulics, and had spatted fixed landing gear. The fixed undercarriage freed space and payload sufficient for twelve .303 Browning machine guns and 5000 rounds, and 154 Imperial gallons (700 litres) of fuel (double the range and ammunition capacity of the Hawker Hurricane and Supermarine Spitfire). The M.20 was fitted with a bubble canopy for improved 360-degree vision.

In line with a design philosophy emphasising simplicity, speed and re-using available components, the engine was a Rolls-Royce Merlin XX "power egg"  identical to those used on Merlin-powered Avro Lancasters and Bristol Beaufighters. This conferred flight performance that fell between those of Britain's two frontline fighters.

Testing and evaluation

The first prototype first flew on 15 September 1940, and was tested at the A & AEE under the military serial number AX834 against Specification F.19/40. Armed with eight .303 Browning machine guns like the Hurricane, the M.20 prototype was faster than the Hurricane but slower than Spitfire types then in production, but carried more ammunition and had greater range than either. Once the Luftwaffe had been defeated over Britain, the need for the M.20 vanished and the design was abandoned without entering production. The first prototype was scrapped at Woodley.

A second prototype, U-0228 (later DR616) was built to Specification N.1/41 for a Fleet Air Arm shipboard fighter, equipped with an arrestor hook and catapult launch points. It first flew on 8 April 1941. This variant could be launched by catapult aircraft merchant ships which lacked flight decks so the aircraft were to be ditched after their mission, and to facilitate this the undercarriage could be jettisoned. However, obsolete Hurricanes were modified to fill this role, which rendered a shipboard variant of the M.20 unnecessary. Consequently, this prototype was also scrapped.

Test pilot Eric Brown flew this aircraft in January 1942.  He reported that "although surprisingly nippy in performance, could not match the Martlet, Hurricane, or Spitfire in manoeuvrability".  It lacked also the excellent deck landing characteristics of the Martlet.

Accounts compare the M.20's performance with that of Battle of Britain aircraft. The M.20 ( at ) was powered by a Rolls-Royce Merlin XX with a two‑speed supercharger. The Spitfire was armed with two  cannons and four  machine guns. The other two aircraft were armed with eight   machine guns.

Specifications (M.20/4)

See also

References

Citations

Bibliography
 Bridgeman, Leonard. "The Miles M.20." Jane's Fighting Aircraft of World War II. London: Studio, 1946. .
 Brown, Don. "Last-ditch defender". Aeroplane Monthly, Vol. 4, No. 4, April 1976, pp. 207–211. 
 Green, William. Warplanes of the Second World War, Fighters, Vol. 2. London: Macdonald, 1961.
 Jarrett, Philip. "Nothing Ventured..." Part 21. Aeroplane Monthly, Volume 20 No. 1, Issue 225, January 1992, pp. 54–60. London: IPC. ISSN 0143-7240. 
 Mason, Francis K. The British Fighter since 1912. Annapolis, Maryland: Naval Institute Press, 1992. .
 Mondey, David. The Hamlyn Concise Guide to British Aircraft of World War II. London: Chancellor Press, 2002. .
 Swanborough, Gordon. British Aircraft at War, 1939–1945. East Sussex, UK: HPC Publishing, 1997. .

1940s British fighter aircraft
Cancelled military aircraft projects of the United Kingdom
M.20
Single-engined tractor aircraft
Low-wing aircraft
Aircraft first flown in 1940